Spirkelbach is a municipality in Südwestpfalz district, in Rhineland-Palatinate, western Germany.

Politics
The council consists of twelve in Spirkelbach Council members who worked for the local elections on 7 June 2009 in a majority vote were chosen, and the honorary mayor as chairman.

References

Municipalities in Rhineland-Palatinate
South Palatinate
Südwestpfalz